Çavuşlar is a village in Gülnar district of Mersin Province, Turkey. According to a local historian, the village was named after a certain Turkmen tribe leader named Ömer Çavuş lived during the late 17th century . The population of the village  was 333 as of 2012.

References

Villages in Gülnar District